Hyatt Bass (born 1969) is an American novelist and philanthropist.

Early life and education
Her father, Sid Bass, is an oil heir and business executive. Her mother, Anne Hendricks Bass, was a philanthropist and art collector. Her parents divorced in 1986. Two polaroid pictures of her taken in 1980, when she was a child, by Andy Warhol were gifted by the Andy Warhol Foundation for the Visual Arts to the Princeton University Art Museum and the Pennsylvania Academy of the Fine Arts in 2008.

She graduated with an A.B. in English from Princeton University in 1991 after completing an 85-page-long senior thesis titled "Gender Versus Genre: Representations of Women in Five Films [Notorious, Desperately Seeking Susan, Born in Flames, Illusions and Streetwise]."

Career
In 2000, she was the screenwriter and director of 75 Degrees in July.

She published a novel entitled The Embers in 2009. She took seven years to write it. The novel is about Laura and Joel Ascher, two Manhattanites whose marriage ends in divorce after their son Thomas dies. Fifteen years later, they reunite for their daughter Emily's wedding. In a review for The Book Reporter, Bass was described as "a gifted writer whose storytelling acumen and evocative prose speak to her real potential as a novelist."

Philanthropy
She has made charitable contributions to the National Book Foundation, the Sadie Nash Leadership Project and The Marshall Project. She has also funded the documentary Women, War & Peace on PBS. In 2010, she co-chaired the 23 Annual Stepping Out and Stepping Up Gala organized by the New York Women's Foundation.

Wealth
In 2007, Vanity Fair reported that "as of some years ago", Hyatt and her sister Samantha had trust funds of US$280 million each.

Personal life
She is married to Josh Klausner, and she has two sons. They live in Greenwich Village, Manhattan, in New York City.

Bibliography
Hyatt Bass. The Embers. New York City: Henry Holt and Co.. 2009. 304 pages.

References

External links
Official website

1969 births
Living people
People from Greenwich Village
Princeton University alumni
American women novelists
American women screenwriters
Philanthropists from New York (state)
21st-century American novelists
Bass family
21st-century American women writers
Novelists from New York (state)
Film directors from New York City
Screenwriters from New York (state)